Ayteke Bi (Äiteke bi), formerly Novokazalinsk, is an urban-type settlement and the administrative center of Kazaly District in Kyzylorda Region of Kazakhstan. Population:

See also
 Kazaly, a town in Kazaly district

References

Populated places in Kyzylorda Region